Thompson Hill (‘Halm Thompson’ \'h&lm 'tomp-s&n\) is the mostly ice-covered ridge rising to 934 m in central Sofia University Mountains, northern Alexander Island in Antarctica. It surmounts Nichols Snowfield to the southeast and Poste Valley to the northeast. The vicinity was visited on 2 February 1988 by the geological survey team of Christo Pimpirev and Borislav Kamenov (First Bulgarian Antarctic Expedition), and Philip Nell and Peter Marquis (British Antarctic Survey).

The feature is named after the settlement of Thompson in Western Bulgaria, in connection with Major Frank Thompson (1920-1944), head of the British military mission to the Bulgarian resistance during World War II.

Location
British mapping in 1971.

Maps
 British Antarctic Territory. Scale 1:200000 topographic map. DOS 610 – W 69 70. Tolworth, UK, 1971
 Antarctic Digital Database (ADD). Scale 1:250000 topographic map of Antarctica. Scientific Committee on Antarctic Research (SCAR). Since 1993, regularly upgraded and updated

Notes

References
 Bulgarian Antarctic Gazetteer. Antarctic Place-names Commission. (details in Bulgarian, basic data in English)
 Thompson Hill. SCAR Composite Gazetteer of Antarctica

External links
 Thompson Hill. Copernix satellite image

Mountains of Alexander Island
Bulgaria and the Antarctic